During the 2022–23 season, the Men's team will play in Superettan and the Women's team will play in Basketettan Södra. Both teams compete in the Swedish cup during the season.

Players

Men

Squad information

New Players

Women

Squad information

Preseason

Swedish Cup

Men

Women

Regular Season

Men (Superettan)

References 

Sport in Helsingborg
2022–23 in European basketball by club